Aromal Chekavar, also known as Puthooram Veettil Aromal Chekavar, was a legendary warrior who is believed to have lived during the 12th century in the North Malabar region of Kerala, India. He was a warrior from a Thiyyar community and a paramount chief of the Puthooram family. His sister, Unniyarcha, was also a skilled warrior.

Biography 
Aromal Chekavar, chief of eighteen kalaris, was born in Puthooram Tharavadu, to Kannappachevakar in Kadathanadu. He had a sister named Unniyarcha and a brother named Unnikannan. Aromal's son was Kannapanunni. His wives were Kunjunnuli, daughter of the uncle, and Thumpolarcha of Mikavil Satteri family. Apart from Kannapanunni, who was born in Kunjunnuli, he also has a son in Thumbolarcha.

Puthariyankam
According to historian A Sreedhara Menon, Chekavar was expert in ankam fighting, a quality which he inherited from his father Kannappa Chekavar, who in his own days was a master of this technique. The story of how Aromal Chekavar went for the ankam and later died a heroic death is the central theme in the group of ballads concerned. The Kaimal of Kurungadi, the Koranauar or head of a matrilineal family, left on pilgrimage in his old age leaving the management of the household jointly in the hands of his two nephews, Unni Chãndror and Unni Konãr. As one of them was elder to the other by a day, he felt aggrieved that he was not given full charge.

Meanwhile, the Karanavar returned home from his pilgrimage and died of old age. The dispute between the two nephews reached a stage when it could be settled Heroes and Heroines of the Northern Ballads only by an ankam and a decision to this effect was taken. Unni Chãndror engaged on his side Aringotar Chekavar, a well known expert in ankam who was also notorious for his lack of respect for the ethics of warfare. Unni Konãr who wanted to outwit his rival enlisted the services of Aromal Chekavar by paying a handsome sum of money ( Ankappanam). The attempt of his parents, brother and sister Unniarcha to dissuade him from this resolve did not bear fruit. Chandu Chekavar, the nephew of Chekavar's father, accompanied the hero to be of assistance to him at the ankam. He had a grouse against Chekavar for having opposed the suggestion to give Unniarcha in marriage to him. He entered into a secret understanding with Aringotar.

He also influenced the Kollan who made the weapons for Aromal Chekavar to commit fraud and thus ensured that the weapons with which he fought were defective. Though Aromal Chekavar could kill Aringotar, in spite of the fact that the shield broke at a crucial moment during the encounter, he fell on the field exhausted and with minor wounds. Chandu took advantage of this opportunity to thrust the rod of his lamp (Kuthuvilakku) into one of the wounds which eventually brought about his death. However, Chekavar breathed his last only after telling the story of Chandu's treachery to his father and sister, A Sreedhara Menon Conclusion. History has it that Chandu Chekavar was later responsible for the death of his uncle Aromalunni Chekavar, the son of the brave Unniyarcha, and later beheaded Chandu Chekavar and returned home to Puthuram Veedu.

Chandu eventually married the daughter of Aringotar and became the owner of his estate and treasures.

In popular culture 
Several films about Aaromal Chekavar have been made:
Aromalunni (1972)
 Oru Vadakkan Veeragatha (1989)Reel to Real: The mind, through the lens of Malayalam cinema.
 Puthooramputhri Unniyarcha (2002).
 A television serial titled Unniyarcha was aired on Asianet (2006).
 His character was also shown in Veeram (2016)

References

Thiyyar warriors
Indian warriors